"Cover on My Heart" is a pop ballad performed by Guy Sebastian and is the third single from his third album Closer to the Sun. Sebastian announced that this song was the album's third single in April 2007. The single was released on 28 July 2007 in Australia, set by his record label Sony BMG Australia. Sebastian performed the song on various programmes such as Sunrise and Rove Live.

Music video
The music video for "Cover on My Heart" was released on 13 June 2007 on the Sony BMG website. It features Sebastian walking the streets of Sydney (where the video was shot) chasing after his love interest who he longs to declare his love for before it is too late. The video also contains a slightly different version of the single to the one released on Closer to the Sun.

Track listing

Charts

References

2007 singles
Guy Sebastian songs
Songs written by Anders Bagge
Songs written by Peer Åström
Songs written by Guy Sebastian
2006 songs
Sony BMG singles